The Pierre Micropolitan Statistical Area, as defined by the United States Census Bureau, is an area consisting of two counties in South Dakota, anchored by the state capital city, Pierre. As of the 2000 census, the μSA had a population of 19,253 (though a July 1, 2009 estimate placed the population at 19,761).

Counties
Hughes
Stanley

Communities
Cities
Blunt
Fort Pierre
Pierre (Principal city)
Towns
Harrold
Unincorporated places
Canning
Hayes

Demographics
As of the census of 2000, there were 19,253 people, 7,623 households, and 5,085 families residing within the μSA. The racial makeup of the μSA was 89.51% White, 0.19% African American, 8.15% Native American, 0.38% Asian, 0.02% Pacific Islander, 0.29% from other races, and 1.46% from two or more races. Hispanic or Latino of any race were 1.11% of the population.

The median income for a household in the μSA was $42,070, and the median income for a family was $49,216. Males had a median income of $31,070 versus $21,777 for females. The per capita income for the μSA was $20,495.

See also
South Dakota census statistical areas

References

 
Geography of Hughes County, South Dakota
Geography of Stanley County, South Dakota